The 1901 Wyoming Cowboys football team represented the University of Wyoming as an independent during the 1901 college football season. In its second season under head coach William McMurray, the team played only one game, defeating the Laramie Athletic Club by a 38–0 score. There was no team captain.

Schedule

References

Wyoming
Wyoming Cowboys football seasons
Wyoming Cowboys football
College football undefeated seasons